The Vinarc i Epërm Catholic Church is a cultural heritage monument in Vinarc i Epërm, Mitrovica, Kosovo.

History
It was used for burials and its churchyard is now part of the local cemetery. The one-sided church includes an apse with a stone arch. Late 20th century renovations include a two-layer roof covering the vault with concrete slabs and re-plastering on the façade. Up until the Kosovo War in 1999, the church was used by the Serbian Orthodox Church, and since then has been abandoned. A cistern supplies water on the northern side of the church, and legend has it that a bridge once stood nearby. During the Kosovo War, the building was graffitied inside and out, the front door demolished, and the interior plaster burned and soaked. Though not used for worship, the building was restored by the Kosovo Ministry of Culture, Youth, and Sport in 2012.

References

Historic sites in Kosovo
Roman Catholic churches in Kosovo
18th-century Roman Catholic church buildings